Llombai is a municipality in the comarca of Ribera Alta in the Valencian Community, Spain. It is a village  of the Marquesat.

References

Municipalities in the Province of Valencia
Ribera Alta (comarca)